Daniela Jacob (born 20 June 1961) is a German climate scientist. She heads the Climate Service Center Germany (GERICS) and is a visiting professor at the Leuphana University of Lüneburg.

Biography 
Jacob studied meteorology from 1980 to 1986 at the Technical University of Darmstadt and received her doctorate in 1991 from the University of Hamburg.

She is married and has one daughter.

Work 
Jacob's research focuses on regional climate modeling and the water cycle.

Jacob was one of the lead authors of the IPCC Fifth Assessment Report and was a coordinating lead author of the Special Report on Global Warming of 1.5 °C (2018).

Jacob is the editor-in-chief and co-founder of Elsevier journal Climate Services. She is also a coordinator, along with Eleni Katragkou and Stefan Sobolowski, of EURO-CORDEX, a scientific community for European regional climate modeling.

Selected publications

References 

1961 births
German climatologists
20th-century German women scientists
Intergovernmental Panel on Climate Change lead authors
21st-century German women scientists
University of Hamburg alumni
Technische Universität Darmstadt alumni
Academic staff of the Leuphana University of Lüneburg
Living people